A New Day Yesterday Live is the first live album by American blues rock musician Joe Bonamassa. Recorded in December 2001 during the promotional tour for Bonamassa's debut album A New Day Yesterday, it was released in 2002 by Premier Artists.

Reception

Music website AllMusic gave A New Day Yesterday Live 3.5 out of five stars, with reviewer Eduardo Rivadavia praising the album but noting it as an unnecessary release given the studio album came out only a few months earlier. Guitar Nine Records reports that Guitar Magazine Guitar World gave the album a four-star review, describing it as "one funky good time". Richard Verbrugge of the website Lords of Metal was equally positive about the album, claiming that it "shows [Bonamassa] belongs at the top of the blues rock genre".

Track listing

Personnel

Musical performers
Joe Bonamassa – guitar, vocals
Eric Czar – bass
Kenny Kramme – drums

Production personnel
David Brinker – production
David Fritz – production
Roy Weisman – production
Diane Gentile – production assistance

Additional personnel
Josh Engelhardt – engineering
Drew Lavyne – engineering
William Putt – engineering
Joe Blaney – mixing

References

2002 live albums
Joe Bonamassa albums